Hinton Charterhouse Field is a 0.32 hectare biological Site of Special Scientific Interest (SSSI) near the village of Hinton Charterhouse in Bath and North East Somerset, United Kingdom. It was SSSI notified in 1991.

The site is situated on a west-facing slope of a shallow valley of the Cotswolds to the south of Bath and is underlain by Oolitic Limestone. The sward contains a population of the nationally rare Field Eryngo (Eryngium campestre).

References

Sites of Special Scientific Interest in Avon
Bath and North East Somerset
Sites of Special Scientific Interest notified in 1991